Red Alert is an album by pianist Red Garland which was recorded in 1977 and released on the Galaxy label in the following year.

Reception

The AllMusic review by Scott Yanow stated "This is an interesting set, featuring pianist Red Garland with a sextet ... With one of the largest recording groups he ever led, Garland sounds fine, but the material could certainly have been more inspired".

Track listing
 "Red Alert" (Nat Adderley) – 10:34
 "Theme for a Tarzan Movie" (Adderley) – 3:57
 "The Whiffenpoof Song" (Guy H. Scull, Meade Minnigerode, George S. Pomeroy) – 8:20
 "Sweet Georgia Brown" (Ben Bernie, Maceo Pinkard, Kenneth Casey) – 11:13
 "Stella by Starlight" (Victor Young, Ned Washington) – 5:45	
 "It's Impossible" (Armando Manzanero, Sid Wayne) – 5:37

Personnel
Red Garland – piano
Nat Adderley – cornet (tracks 1, 2 & 4) 
Harold Land (tracks 1, 4 & 5), Ira Sullivan (tracks 1, 3 & 4) – tenor saxophone
Ron Carter – bass
Frank Butler – drums

References

Galaxy Records albums
Red Garland albums
1978 albums